The 9×21mm Gyurza (Гюрза, Russian for "blunt-nosed viper") round is a Russian handgun round designed to defeat body armor that was developed by TsNIITochMash for its SR-1 Vektor semi-automatic pistol and SR-2 Veresk submachine gun.

Performance
The method of construction of the rounds allows them to be effective against both unarmored and armored targets. The bullet has a hard sub-caliber core contained within an outer sleeve and separated from it by a polyethylene layer. If the bullet strikes an unarmored target, it holds together to produce a wide wound channel. If the bullet strikes an armored target, the sleeve is stripped away and the core penetrates alone. The disadvantage of the rounds is that high impact velocities are needed for them to work effectively, so the bullets are relatively light to maximize their muzzle velocity. This means they will lose velocity relatively quickly, limiting their effective range.

Variants
SP-10 (7N29) - armor-piercing bullet with hardened steel core

SP-11 (7N28) - standard FMJ bullet with lead core

SP-12 - low ricocheting, expanding bullet

SP-13 (7BT3) - tracer AP bullet based on 7N29

Designations
 9×21mm Gyurza
 9mm Gyurza

Notes

External links
  9×21mm pistol cartridges 
 9x21mm Ammunition (Russian)
 SR-1 Vector - Modern Firearms
 SP Ammunition - Modern Firearms

Pistol and rifle cartridges
Military cartridges
TsNIITochMash products